William L. Fash, Jr. (born 1954) is one of the founders of The Copan Association, which he describes as "charged with research on and preservation of the Copan Archaeological Site, and other archaeological, cultural and natural resources of Honduras." The other founder is Ricardo Agurcia Fasquelle. Fash currently holds the position of Bowditch Professor of Central American and Mexican Archaeology and Ethnology at Harvard and was previously Chair of the Anthropology Department and the Director of the Peabody Museum. He has been awarded the highest civilian honor of the Government of Honduras, The Order of Jose Cecilio del Valle. Also, in 2008, he was given the Hoja de Laurel de Oro by the Government of Honduras for 30-plus years of "preserving and documenting Honduras' cultural heritage." He describes his research interests as "the rise and fall of complex society and civilizations; ideology and political symbolism; settlement pattern studies; archaeology and ethnology of Mesoamerica; [and] archaeological conservation."

Fash is corresponding fellow of the Academia Mexicana de la Historia since March 2017.

Educational background 
In 1975, Dr. Fash excavated at Grasshopper, Cibecue, Arizona as a student in a summer field school, although, he is most noted for his work on the Maya site of Copan, Honduras. He received his B.A. in anthropology from the University of Illinois in 1976. That same year he received a National Science Foundation Graduate Fellowship for the research he would do at Harvard, from which he graduated with a Ph.D. in 1983. In 1995, he accomplished an Honorary Ed.D. from Tulane University.

Archaeological excavations 
Besides his participation at the Grasshopper Site, William Fash has participated in many excavations at Copan, some of those span several years and involve multiple researchers. Often Dr. Fash was the director of these excavations. He first worked in Chalcatzingo, Mexico in 1974 and again at the same site in 1976, it would be 24 years before he worked at a site in Mexico again. Below are some of the excavations he participated in:

Proyecto Arqueologico Copan – Fash had four different positions during this project over seven years. He worked as an archaeologist, Director of Settlement Surveys and Excavations, Excavations Director, and Research and Museums Consultant.

Copan Temples Project – Fash began work on this project the same year as the Copan Mosaics Project, it functioned as an international field school. He directed it for four years (1985–1990).

Copan Mosaics Project (1985–present) – William Fash initiated (with Barbara Fash and Rudy Larios) and directs this project, which started in 1985 but is currently unfinished. In 1987, Fash was awarded a Fulbright Senior Research Fellowship for this project, whose purpose is "to record and protect Copan’s hundreds of stone mosaic sculptures." To give an idea of the extent of the project, involves all of Copan's Principle group and preservation of its Hieroglyphic Stairway.

Copan Acropolis Archaeological Project (1988–1997) – Fash directed this project for 8 years (1988–1996), it involved the excavation of temples, courts, and tombs at Copan. Like the Copan Mosaics Project, this project also aided the architectural sculpture cataloguing process. Other researchers that assisted this project include Robert Sharer and Ricardo Agurcia Fasquelle.

Harvard Field School in Maya Archaeology at Copan, Honduras – Fash directed this project for 6 years.

From 2000 to 2003 he co-directed Xalla Palace Project at Teotihuacan, Mexico, with Leonardo López Luján and Linda Manzanilla.

From 2007 to 2013 Fash directed the Rastrojón Archaeological Project (PARACOPAN), a programme of Rescue archaeology and conservation at Rastrojón, a Classical Maya site close to Copán.

Conservation 
William Fash has had director positions for two museums, he was the Executive Director for The Anthropology Museum at Northern Illinois University from 1987–1992, and is the Director of the Peabody Museum at Harvard, as previously mentioned. He has also participated in several Museum exhibits and conservation efforts. He served as Interim Director of The Programa Integral de Conservacion del Parque Archeologico Copan, one of the conservation efforts that involve the participation of several organizations including the Honduran Institute of Anthropology and History, Harvard University, the Getty Conservation Institute, and UNESCO. The involvement of UNESCO shows the importance of Fash’s work on a global level. The 1992 Royal Scribes Tomb Exhibit, at the Regional Museum of Maya Archaeology in Copan, shows one example of an exhibit he assisted.

References

External links 
 Askew, Marc et al. (2010) Heritage and Globalisation, S. Labadi and C. Long (eds.), New York, New York: Routledge.
 Asociacion Copan (2008). http://www.asociacioncopan.org/
 Canuto, Marcello A. (2009). Curriculum Vita. http://parep.research.yale.edu/Website/documents/MACcv.pdf
 Copan Maya Foundation (2008). http://www.copanmaya.org/index.php/maya-history/timelines/copan-archeology-timeline
 Fash, William L. (2009). Curriculum Vita. http://www.fas.harvard.edu/~anthro/fash/docs/cv.pdf
 Fash, Barbara W. (2003). Copan Archive and Database Project. Famsi. http://www.famsi.org/reports/00042/00042Fash01.pdf
 Williamson, Ricard V. (1996). Excavations, Interpretations, and Implications of the Earliest Structures Beneath Structure 10L-26 at Copan, Honduras. Tulane University. http://www.mesoweb.com/pari/publications/rt10/Excavations.pdf
 

1954 births
Living people
American anthropologists
American archaeologists
Harvard University alumni
University of Illinois alumni